Billy Vernon Harvey (October 11, 1932 – March 2, 2006) was an American politician who served in the Mississippi State Senate from 1988 until his death in 2006. At his death, he was chairman of the Senate's Forestry Committee.

References

External links
 

1932 births
2006 deaths
Democratic Party Mississippi state senators
20th-century American politicians
People from Jefferson Davis County, Mississippi